Mr Puaz is a Tanzanian Talent Manager and founder of Puaz Wear, born 31 March 1985, in Arusha, Tanzania. He  signed with the record label WCB Wasafi in 2018 as a talent manager. He has represented some of the artist in East Africa such as Harmonize, Nedy Music, Shetta and many others. In 2019, Puaz won an award  on Starqt Awards as "Most Supportive Man Of The Year" in South Africa and Africa Entertainment Awards USA as "Best African Talent/Artist Manager". BBC Swahili has also mentioned him as one of the top Talent Managers in Tanzania.

Music career 
He started his career as a dancer which opened doors for him in the music industry. He first wanted to be a musician and was able to record few songs such as " Usiku Wa Leo", but this was not a breakthrough for him.

In 2016, he was asked by Tanzania hip-hop artist  Shetta, to become his manager and that was the start of Joel's career as a Talent manager. He helped to bring artist’s such as Ben Pol, Darasa, Vanessa Mdee, Christian Bella, Nedy Music to stardom including many others.

In 2018, he signed with  WCB Wasafi Record label where he was appointed manager to Harmonize who was previously managed by Ricardo Momo. Unfortunately later that year in December he decided to part ways with the record label due to misunderstandings with the artist Harmonize to work independently and on other projects. In October 2018, he launched his digital book titled "Become Rich With Your Music".

Business career

Puaz Wear 
Puaz Wear is a fashion brand by Mr Puaz under Puaz Company Limited which launched in August 2021. It  includes clothing, accessories such as sunglasses and footwear etc. The fashion brand has been described as groundbreaking and in a statement regarding the launch, he said that Puaz Wear is a brand that hopes to change the whole look of clothing, shoes for women and men, handbags and more by giving them a wide range of fashion ideas but also bringing them closer to their favorite brands, and this will further support the growth of the fashion industry.

Awards and nominations 
{| class="wikitable"
|+
!Year
!Category
!Awards
!Result
|-
|2019
|Most Supportive Man Of The Year
|Starqt Awards South Africa
|
|-
|2019
|Best African Talent/Artist Manager
|2019 African Entertainment Awards USA 
|
|-
|2015
|Most Promising Act 
|TVMA ( Tanzania Vibe Magazine Awards )
|

References

External links  

 
 
 
 

People from Arusha District
Living people
1985 births
People from Dar es Salaam
Tanzanian Christians
Talent managers